Waseeq Ahmed (born 3 November 1986) is a cricketer who currently plays for the Bahrain national cricket team.

Career 
Ahmed was first selected for the international team during the 2021 ICC Men's T20 World Cup Asia Qualifier, and made his international debut on 22 October 2021, against Qatar. He went on to play in 2 games after his debut, managing a run and 4 wickets.

After the tournament, Ahmed was then selected to play in the 2022 ICC Men's T20 World Cup Global Qualifier A. Ahmed played in all 5 games during the tournament and managed to take 3 wickets.

References 

1986 births
Living people
Bahraini cricketers
Bahrain Twenty20 International cricketers
Pakistani expatriate sportspeople in Bahrain